The Burgberg Cable Car is a cable car in Bad Harzburg, Germany. It was built in 1929 by the Bleichert engineering corporation and has a length of 481 metres. Its hauling cable has a diameter of 18 mm, its carrying cable a diameter of 37 mm. It is driven by a  engine at the summit station. It has two cabins carrying up to 18 passengers each.

The cable car is named after the Burgberg mountain, site of the historic Harzburg Castle, built by Emperor Henry IV about 1068. The upper terminus was erected next to the ruins. Cable car and stations are preserved in their original 1920s condition.

The large gondolas transport passengers in three minutes to the Großer Burgberg (483 m). From there, there is a panoramic view of Bad Harzburg, the surrounding mountains and far across the Harz region. On the Burgberg are castle ruins to explore and trails for experienced and inexperienced hikers. It is also the jump-off point for many walks through the Harz to popular destinations such as the Molkenhaus or the crags of the Rabenklippen.

References

External links

  
 Bad Harzburg including the cable car at www.germany-tourism.co.uk. 

Goslar (district)
Cable cars in Germany
1929 establishments in Germany